Dents is a British company that crafts luxury leather gloves, handbags, small leather goods.  Dents is known for its hand cutting, sewing, and stitching techniques, which are still practised today on some limited top-end products, most merchandise being purchased from third-party factories.

History

Dents was established in Worcester in 1777 as a manufacturer of fine leather gloves by John Dent (1751–1811). It is possibly Britain's oldest existing fashion manufacturer. Dent's sons, John and William, helped the company expand throughout the 18th and 19th centuries. In 1845, mechanical sewing was introduced to the company to assist craftspeople.

In 1847 the business became Dent, Allcroft & Co. when John Derby Allcroft ran the company. Under Allcroft, annual production quadrupled to over 12 million pairs in 1884 and Dents became the premier glove producer in the world.

Dents is also known for historically providing leather gloves to the British Royal Family, such as George VI and Elizabeth II's coronation gloves. Dents' Museum holds gloves worn by Lord Nelson, and Queen Victoria. Dents' gloves have been featured in several films. Examples include the unlined black gloves worn by Daniel Craig portraying James Bond in the 2012 movie, Skyfall, the black gloves worn by Michael Keaton portraying Batman in 1989 film, Batman, and the purple suede gloves worn by Jack Nicholson portraying the Joker in the same film.

The company has a factory in Warminster, Wiltshire, having been present in the town since 1937. Since sometime before 1992, the company has been a subsidiary of Dewhurst Dent plc, a maker of fashion accessories based in Bolton.

Products
The firm exports to Europe, North America, Asia, and Australia, and has expanded to include belts, handbags, hats, serapes, and other small leather goods in the Dents Collection.

The glove patterns used today date back to 1839. Each pair of Dents Heritage gloves is handmade in England by a Dents craftsman. Every glove is individually bench cut. Quirks, which are small, diamond-shaped pieces of leather, are hand sewn at the base of the fingers in order to provide a snug fit. Dents craftsmen also utilize a hand felling technique in which the cuff of the glove is stitched to the lining, improving the gloves' shape and comfort. Dents Heritage gloves are made with peccary skins, North American deerskin, and fine aniline Ethiopian hairsheep leathers. Heritage gloves are available in a handful of stores worldwide with a luxury price tag and should not be confused with the imported gloves sold in most stores.

Personal lives

In 1837, John and William Dent purchased Sudeley Castle which had been the home of former queen Catherine Parr who died in 1548. The castle and chapel were "ruinous" at the time, having been extensively damaged during the Civil War.

The Dents' restoration of the castle was quite sensitive, deciding to not entirely rebuild the castle, rather leaving part of it as picturesque ruins, giving the castle much of its character still seen today. One reliable source states that the restoration was directed by George Gilbert Scott, "working on the western side of the inner court in the style of the existing Medieval and Elizabethan buildings"; Gilbert Scott subsequently began the restoration of the castle's free-standing St Mary's chapel.

When Sudeley was habitable again, the brothers set about filling the castle with artworks. After their deaths, their nephew, John Coucher Dent, inherited the castle in 1855. He and his wife Emma Dent continued the restoration.

References

External links
 

Gloves
Companies based in Wiltshire
Manufacturing companies based in Worcester, England
History of Worcester, England
1800s fashion
1900s fashion
2000s fashion
British companies established in 1777
Clothing retailers of England
Clothing companies of England
Leather manufacturers
Warminster